This article provides details of international football games played by the Bangladesh national football team from 2020 to present.

Results

2020

2021

2022

2023

Forthcoming fixtures
The following matches are scheduled:

Head to head records
As of 17 March 2023 after match against

References

Bangladesh national football team results
2020s in Bangladeshi sport